Party is a 1996 Portuguese-French comedy-drama film directed by Manoel de Oliveira. It was screened in competition at the 1996 Venice Film Festival.

Cast
 Michel Piccoli as Michel 
 Irene Papas as Irene 
 Leonor Silveira as Leonor 
 Rogério Samora as Rogério 
 Sofia Alves as Rapariga

Awards
Golden Globes (Portugal)
Best Director

References

External links
 

1996 films
1990s Portuguese-language films
1990s French-language films
1996 drama films
Films directed by Manoel de Oliveira
Films produced by Paulo Branco
French multilingual films
Portuguese multilingual films
1990s French films
1996 multilingual films